Joseph Gomez may refer to:

Joseph Gómez (born 1987), Gambian footballer
Joe Gomez (footballer) (born 1997), English footballer